The Way is an American Christian hardcore and Christian rock band, and they primarily play hardcore punk, punk rock, and alternative rock. They come from the cities of Oxnard, California and Santa Paula, California. The band started making music in 2010, and their members are lead vocalist, Johnny, lead guitarist and background vocalist, Manny, bassist, Tank, rhythm guitarist and background vocalist, Harry, and drummer, Ryan. The band have released one extended play, Helpless but Not Hopeless, in 2011, with Thumper Punk Records. Their first studio album, The Fight Is Ours, was released in 2010 by Thumper Punk Records. The subsequent studio album, I Keep Falling, was released by Thumper Punk Records, in 2013.

Background
The Way is a Christian hardcore and Christian rock band from the cities of Oxnard, California and Santa Paula, California. Their members are lead vocalist, Johnny, lead guitarist and background vocalist, Manny, bassist, Tank, rhythm guitarist and background vocalist, Harry, and drummer and background vocalist, Ryan.

Music history
The band commenced as a musical entity in 2010 with their release, The Fight Is Ours, a studio album, that was released by Thumper Punk Records on June 1, 2010. They released, an extended play, Helpless but Not Hopeless, on December 8, 2011, with Thumper Punk Records. Their subsequent studio album, I Keep Falling, was released on December 10, 2013 by Thumper Punk Records.

Members
Current members
 Johnny - lead vocals
 Manny - lead guitar, background vocals
 Tank - bass
 Harry - rhythm guitar, background vocals
 Ryan - drums

Discography
Studio albums
 The Fight Is Ours (June 1, 2010, Thumper Punk)
 I Keep Falling (December 10, 2013, Thumper Punk)
EPs
 Helpless but Not Hopeless (December 8, 2011, Thumper Punk)

References

External links
Facebook page

Rock music groups from California
Musical groups from Ventura County, California
2010 establishments in California
Musical groups established in 2010
People from Santa Paula, California